Alejandra Soler Gilabert (8 July 1913 – 1 March 2017) was a Spanish politician and schoolteacher. She also worked for the Diplomatic Academy of the Ministry of Foreign Affairs of the Russian Federation.

Life
She studied at the Institución de la Enseñanza para la Mujer, the Instituto Lluís Vives and humanities and schoolteaching at the university, where she was also in the athletic federation FUE.

She took part in the revolts against Miguel Primo de Rivera and in 1934, she became a member of the communist party.

After the Spanish Civil War, she was in a French refugee camp, where she could later run away with her husband Arnoldo Azzatti (whose father was the journalist Félix Azzatti) to the Soviet Union where she worked as a schoolteacher for the Spanish refugee children, and in World War II, she saved 14 children in the Battle of Stalingrad.

She took part in the 15-M Movement in 2011.

Works 
 2009, La vida es un río caudaloso con peligrosos rápidos

References

1913 births
2017 deaths
People from Valencia
Spanish schoolteachers
Politicians from the Valencian Community
Spanish centenarians
20th-century Spanish educators
21st-century Spanish educators
Spanish women educators
Women centenarians
20th-century women educators
21st-century women educators
20th-century Spanish women politicians